Holoschkuhria is a genus of Peruvian flowering plants in the daisy family (Asteraceae or Compositae).

Species
The only known species is Holoschkuhria tetramera, native to northern Peru.

References

Monotypic Asteraceae genera
Bahieae
Flora of Peru